Ingars is a Latvian masculine give name.

Notable people named Ingars 
Ingars Dude (born 1987), Latvian handball player
Ingars Stuglis (born 1996), Latvian footballer
Ingars Viļums (born 1977 ), rock musician and bass player (Brainstorm)

References

Latvian masculine given names